Jhon Carlos Chancellor Cedeño (born 2 January 1992) is a Venezuelan professional footballer who plays as a centre-back for Campeonato Brasileiro Série A club Coritiba and for the Venezuela national team.

Career
On 10 January 2018, Chancellor signed a two-and-a-half-year contract with Russian Premier League club FC Anzhi Makhachkala.

On 14 February 2019, Anzhi Makhachkala announced that Chancellor had moved to Qatar Stars League club Al Ahli.

On 21 July 2019, Chancellor signed a one-year deal, subsequently extended to 3 years, with previously Serie A and now Serie B side Brescia.

On 28 February 2022, he joined Polish Ekstraklasa club Zagłębie Lubin until the end of the season, with a one-year extension option. On 25 May 2022, it was revealed he would not extend his contract and would leave the team at the end of the season.

Career statistics

Club

International

International goals
Scores and results list Venezuela's goal tally first.

References

External links

1992 births
People from Ciudad Guayana
Living people
Venezuelan footballers
Association football defenders
Venezuela under-20 international footballers
Venezuela international footballers
Venezuelan expatriate footballers
Expatriate footballers in Russia
Expatriate footballers in Ecuador
Expatriate footballers in Qatar
Expatriate footballers in Italy
Expatriate footballers in Poland
Expatriate footballers in Brazil
A.C.C.D. Mineros de Guayana players
Deportivo La Guaira players
Delfín S.C. footballers
FC Anzhi Makhachkala players
Asociación Civil Deportivo Lara players
Al Ahli SC (Doha) players
Brescia Calcio players
Zagłębie Lubin players
Coritiba Foot Ball Club players
Venezuelan Primera División players
Russian Premier League players
Qatar Stars League players
Ecuadorian Serie A players
Serie A players
Serie B players
Ekstraklasa players
Campeonato Brasileiro Série A players
Venezuelan expatriate sportspeople in Russia
Venezuelan expatriate sportspeople in Ecuador
Venezuelan expatriate sportspeople in Qatar
Venezuelan expatriate sportspeople in Italy
Venezuelan expatriate sportspeople in Poland
Venezuelan expatriate sportspeople in Brazil
2019 Copa América players
2021 Copa América players